Lee Albert Miglin (July 12, 1924 – May 4, 1997) was an American business tycoon and philanthropist. After starting his career as a door-to-door salesman and then broker, Miglin became a successful real estate developer. He was an early developer of business parks. His firm, at one point, proposed the construction of the Miglin-Beitler Skyneedle, which was planned to be the tallest building in the world. Miglin was murdered in his home in May 1997 by Andrew Cunanan, a spree
killer.

Life and career 
Miglin was one of seven children born to a Roman Catholic family of Lithuanian descent. His father was a Czech immigrant who worked as a Central Illinois coal miner and also owned a tavern, ice cream parlor, and soda distributorship. Miglin was born in Westville, Illinois.

Miglin trained as an air cadet during World War II, before attending the University of Illinois.

Miglin began his professional career selling silverware door-to-door and pancake batter out of the trunk of his car. After this, he sold frozen cheesecakes, and subsequent to that sold TV dinners. He quit his salesman job to spend a six month trip across Europe. After this, he decided to make an effort to go into real estate to make substantial money.

In 1956, at the age of 31, Miglin began his real estate career. In the early 1960s, he took a job as a broker with Chicago real estate magnate Arthur Rubloff. At Arthur Rubloff & Co., Miglin would first get involved with warehouse construction, later moving into office development. One of the projects he  was involved in was the development of the first two of the three towers at the President's Plaza office complex near Chicago's O'Hare International Airport. Miglin would later develop the third tower in 1985 with his firm Miglin-Beitler. Miglin was regarded as an early developer of the business park developments. He worked at Rubloff & Co. for 25 years.

In 1959, Miglin married 20-year-old Marilyn Klecka, a Roman Catholic of Czech descent. Klecka, a successful entrepreneur known as the Queen of Makeovers, established a prominent perfume and cosmetics company and appeared on the Home Shopping Network. They would have two children together, Marlena (born 1968) and Duke Miglin (born 1971), the latter of whom would become an actor.

Miglin formed a successful real estate development partnership with J. Paul Beitler, who had also worked at Rubloff & Co. Together, they founded the firm Miglin-Beitler Developments in 1982. Among the projects developed by the firm were Madison Plaza (200 West Madison), 181 West Madison Street, and Oakbrook Terrace Tower (the tallest building in Illinois outside of Chicago). In addition to constructing developments, the firm also managed properties.

In 1988, Miglin-Beitler Developments unveiled plans to construct a 1,999 foot 125-floor skyscraper in Chicago to be called the Miglin-Beitler Skyneedle. This would have been the tallest building in the world at the time of its planned completion. However, the building was never built, with plans faltering during a 1990 downturn of Chicago's downtown office market. Miglin-Beitler had held hopes of resurrecting the project, but these hopes would be dashed by Miglin's murder.

After Miglin-Beitler Developments began shifting its focus away from development and towards property management in the 1990s, Miglin gradually withdrew from the daily operations but still remained involved in the company.

Miglin was a well-regarded figure in Chicago  and was known for his philanthropy.

Miglin was murdered on May 4, 1997, by the spree killer Andrew Cunanan. Miglin's body was found in the garage of his home in Chicago's Gold Coast Historic District. He had been bound at the wrists, and his head was bound with tape, with only a breathing space under his nostrils. He had been tortured with a saw and a screwdriver, his ribs had been broken, he had been beaten and stabbed, and his throat had been slashed with a gardener's bow saw. Cunanan was already wanted in Minneapolis for murdering his friend Jeffrey Trail and his own ex-lover David Madson a few days earlier.

Legacy
Miglin-Beitler Developments merged in 1998 with the New York City real estate Howard and Edward Milstein to form the Chicago-based firm Miglin Beitler Real Estate (MBRE). In 2022, it was announced that Houston-based Transwestern was acquiring the firm. Some of the properties developed by Miglin are today managed by Miglin Properties, LLC.

In popular culture
The second season of the anthology television series American Crime Story: The Assassination of Gianni Versace, recounted the Cunanan spree. It included appearances by Miglin, portrayed by Mike Farrell.  This portrayal was based on Vulgar Favors: Andrew Cunanan, Gianni Versace, and the Largest Failed Manhunt in U.S. History by Maureen Orth, who speculated that Miglin may have been a closeted bisexual man in a secret relationship with Cunanan. The Miglin family has refuted this story, and has insisted that there was no relationship of any kind between Miglin and Cunanan. When the Federal Bureau of Investigation had investigated allegations that Cunnanan had known Miglin or a relative of Miglin's they were unable to establish any link between Miglin and Cunanan.

References 

1924 births
1997 deaths
Businesspeople from Chicago
People from Vermilion County, Illinois
Military personnel from Illinois
American people of Lithuanian descent
American real estate businesspeople
American Roman Catholics
People murdered in Illinois
Victims of serial killers
American torture victims
Deaths by stabbing in Illinois
American military personnel of World War II
American murder victims
Male murder victims